The Geodetic Hills are a mountain range on central Axel Heiberg Island, Nunavut, Canada. It is associated with the Arctic Cordillera mountain system.

In 1995, scientists advocated the hills be managed by the Canadian Parks Service and be annexed to the Ellesmere Island National Park Reserve.

References

Mountain ranges of Qikiqtaaluk Region
Arctic Cordillera